This is a list of notable individuals who currently have or previously had an association with Eastern Michigan University. Eastern Michigan University was formerly known as Michigan State Normal School, Michigan State Normal College, and Eastern Michigan College.

Notable alumni

Academia
 Charles Eugene Beatty – pioneer of Head Start educational program
 Andrew Blackbird – historian and Ottawa tribe leader
 Lee E. Brasseur – Illinois State University professor, author and expert in field of visualization
 Nancy Jane Dean — Presbyterian missionary in Persia, head of the Fiske Seminary at Urmia
 Andrew Foster – first black deaf person to earn master's degree
 Elizabeth Wells Gallup – educator and exponent of Baconian theory of Shakespearian authorship
 Glenn Goerke – former president/chancellor of University of Houston, Houston-Clear Lake, Houston-Victoria, Indiana University East
 William McAndrew, educator who served as superintendent of Chicago Public Schools
 Jackie Jenkins-Scott, President of Wheelock College
 Michael D. Knox (BA 1968), chair and CEO of the US Peace Memorial Foundation and Distinguished Professor, University of South Florida.
 Charles Edward St. John – astronomer.
 Larry Soderquist – corporate and securities law expert, author, and Vanderbilt University professor

Arts, media, and entertainment
 Anouar H. Smaine - Film director, producer, writer and actor 
 Nagarjuna Akkineni – Indian actor
 John Edward Ames – novelist and short story writer
 Kim Antieau – novelist
 Martha E. Cram Bates (1839–1905), writer, journalist, newspaper editor
 Dave Coverly – syndicated cartoonist of Speed Bump
 Warren Defever – rock musician
 Ryan Drummond – voice actor and comedian
 Loren D. Estleman – detective fiction and Western fiction writer
 Dann Florek – actor (Law & Order, Law & Order: Special Victims Unit)
 Zonya Foco – dietitian and author
 Gwen Frostic – artist
 John Hammink – musician, writer and linguist
 John Heffron – winner of NBC's Last Comic Standing 2 in 2004
 Eric Jackson – Panamanian journalist and radio talk show host
 Ella Joyce – stage actress
 Edward Knight – composer
 Greg Mathis – judge; TV personality of Judge Mathis
 Winsor McCay – pioneering cartoonist
 Josef Norris, artist and convicted felon
 Ann Purmell, children's author 
 Gary Reed – comic book writer
 Michealene Cristini Risley – author, writer, award-winning director, blogger for the Huffington Post, producer of Tapestries of Hope
 Joseph Sobran – libertarian, author and syndicated columnist
 Philip Southern – photographer, winner of the 2009 YOBI.tv Pics grand prize
 Afton Williamson - actor, (The Rookie, Homeland, The Breaks, Banshee)
 Daniela Yaniv-Richter – Israeli ceramist and sculptor

Business
 Mohammed Al Gergawi – United Arab Emirates business leader
 Rufus T. Bush – 19th-century oil refining industrialist and yachtsman
 Ron Campbell – CEO of Tampa Bay Lightning of the National Hockey League
 Jesse Divnich – gaming and financial media industry executive, and co-founder of The simExchange and V.P. of EEDAR
 Bruce T. Halle – founder of Discount Tire Co., the largest independent tire dealer in North America
 John Harvey Kellogg – co-founder of the Kellogg Company; co-creator of corn flakes
 Swift Lathers – founder of The Mears Newz newspaper
 Michael G. Morris – President and CEO of American Electric Power
 Jack Roush – CEO and owner of Roush Racing NASCAR; chairman of the board of Roush Enterprises
Elle Simone – Chef, culinary producer, test cook, and food stylist 
 Kevin Saunderson – record producer
 Larry Warren – CEO of Howard University Hospital
 Chuku Wachuku – Nigerian economist and management specialist
 Mary Collins Whiting (1835–1912), lawyer, business woman, teacher

Politics, government, and armed forces
 Edward P. Allen – Republican Congressman from Michigan's 2nd congressional district
 Rick Baccus – US Army Brigadier General
 Leland W. Carr – Michigan Supreme Court justice from 1945 to 1963
 William W. Chalmers – U.S. Representative from Ohio's 9th congressional district and President of the University of Toledo
 Brenda Clack – Democratic member of the Michigan State House of Representatives representing Gennesee County
 Owen Cleary – chair of the Michigan Republican Party 1949–1953; Michigan Secretary of State 1953–1954; unsuccessful Michigan gubernatorial candidate
 John G. Coburn – four-star general; Commander of U.S. Army Materiel Command; chairman and CEO of VT Systems, Inc.
 Dr. Royal S. Copeland - Mayor of Ann Arbor, Michigan; Senator from New York
 Agnes Dobronski - Michigan legislator and educator
 Frederick B. Fancher – politician; seventh Governor of North Dakota
 William Horace Frankhauser – Republican U.S. Representative from Michigan's 3rd congressional district
 Barbara Gervin-Hawkins – Democratic member of the Texas House of Representatives
 Fred W. Green – Mayor of Ionia, Michigan; 31st Governor of Michigan from 1927 to 1931
 Freman Hendrix – former chief of staff and deputy mayor of Detroit under former Mayor Dennis Archer; 2005 mayoral candidate in Detroit
 Dennis M. Hertel – Democratic Congressman from Michigan's 14th congressional district
 John Hieftje – Mayor of Ann Arbor, Michigan
 William H. Hinebaugh – Progressive Congressman from Illinois, assistant attorney general of Illinois, and later president and general counsel of the Central Life Insurance Co., of Illinois
 George H. Hopkins – Civil War veteran, Chair of the Michigan Republican Party and Republican Congressman for Michigan
 Harry Humphries – United States Navy Seal member of Richard Marcinko Seal Team 6; tactical instructor with Advanced Hostage Rescue Team at EMU
 Patrick H. Kelley – Republican U.S. Representative from Michigan's 6th congressional district
 Marilyn Jean Kelly – Michigan Supreme Court Chief Justice from 2008 to the present
 Sandra Love – Democratic representative in the New Jersey General Assembly
 Alfred Lucking – Democratic U.S. Representative from Michigan's 1st congressional district
 Eduardo Maruri – former President of the Barcelona Sporting Club soccer team from Ecuador; former President of the Guayaquil Chamber of Commerce; founder of the UNO political party; former Assembly Member representing Guayas Province in the Ecuadorian Constituent Assembly
 Bill Patmon – democratic member of Ohio House of Representatives
 Charles E. Potter – U.S. Senator from Michigan
 Carl D. Pursell – Republican U.S. Representative from Michigan's 2nd congressional district
 Marvin B. Rosenberry – Chief Justice of the Wisconsin Supreme Court
 Ingrid Sheldon – Mayor of Ann Arbor, Michigan
 Rodney E. Slater – U.S. Secretary of Transportation under President Bill Clinton
 Henry F. Thomas – Republican U.S. Representative from Michigan's 4th congressional district
 Frank W. Wheeler – Republican U.S. Representative from Michigan's 10th congressional district and founder of Saginaw Shipbuilding Company

Sports and athletics

Baseball
 Brian Bixler – Major League Baseball player for the Houston Astros
 Jean Cione - All-American Girls Professional Baseball League Player
 Terry Collins – Major League Baseball  manager for the New York Mets
 Chris Hoiles – Major League Baseball player for the Baltimore Orioles, 1989–1998
 Bob Owchinko - Major League Baseball player
 Pat Sheridan - Major League Baseball player
 Matt Shoemaker - Major League Baseball player for the Los Angeles Angels
 Jim Snyder - Major League Baseball player, coach and manager
 Bob Welch – Major League Baseball pitcher, two-time All-Star, Cy Young Award winner (1990), and best-selling author

Basketball
 Earl Boykins – National Basketball Association (NBA) player, formerly for the Houston Rockets
 Laurie Byrd – basketball coach
 Fred Cofield – NBA player for the New York Knicks and Chicago Bulls
 Derrick Dial – NBA player, formerly with the San Antonio Spurs, New Jersey Nets and Orlando Magic
 Jessie Evans – University of San Francisco basketball coach
 Frank Douglas Garrett – All-America Basketball, Christian author, academic dean
 George Gervin – Hall of Famer of the National Basketball Association
 Stan Heath – head basketball coach, formerly with University of Arkansas and now with University of South Florida
 Grant Long – retired NBA player
 Harvey Marlatt – NBA player for the Detroit Pistons
 Kennedy McIntosh – 1970s NBA player for the Chicago Bulls and Seattle SuperSonics
 Carl Thomas – basketball player for several NBA teams; current assistant coach for men's basketball team
 Charles Thomas – retired basketball player for the Detroit Pistons
Webster Kirksey – retired Harlem Globetrotters / Harlem Magicians player; coach at Ypsilanti Roosevelt High School

Football
 John Banaszak – Pittsburgh Steelers defensive end and three-time Super Bowl champion
 Charlie Batch – National Football League (NFL) player, formerly with the Pittsburgh Steelers
 Ronald Beard – coach for the Prairie View A&M University Panthers
 David Boone – All-Star Canadian Football League defensive lineman
 Lional Dalton – player for the Houston Texans
 Éric Deslauriers – Canadian football Director of Football Operations for the Montreal Alouettes
 Matt Finlay – Canadian football linebacker for the Calgary Stampeders
 Reggie Garrett – Pittsburgh Steelers wide receiver
 T. J. Lang – offensive lineman for the Detroit Lions
 Jereme Perry – defensive back for Cleveland Browns
 Chris Roberson – NFL player
 L. J. Shelton – offensive tackle for four NFL teams
 Barry Stokes – NFL player
 Bob Sutton – NFL defensive coordinator, currently with the Kansas City Chiefs
 Kevin Walter – NFL player, formerly with Houston Texans
 Maxx Crosby – NFL player, Pro bowler Las Vegas Raiders

Track
 Tommy Asinga – Surinamese three-time Olympic track star
 Clement Chukwu – Nigerian Olympic track star
 Hasely Crawford – 1976 men's 100m gold medalist in Montreal
 Savatheda Fynes – Bahamian track and field Olympic gold medalist
 Earl Jones – 1984 Los Angeles Olympics 800 meters bronze medalist
 Hayes Jones – Tokyo Olympics 110-meter hurdles gold medalist
 Paul McMullen – 1996 Olympics track star
 Jamie Nieto – 2004 Olympics track star

Other sports

 Hank Longo - Water ski jump world record holder and Water Ski Hall of Fame inductee
 Zach Gowen – professional wrestler
 Dean Rockwell – Olympic team wrestling coach, 1964; World War II Normandy D-Day invasion hero
 Shirley Spork – Co-founder of the LPGA

Other
 John Norman Collins – Michigan serial killer
 Daniel Holtzclaw – Oklahoma serial rapist

Notable faculty
 Agnes Dobronski – educator and legislator
 Loren D. Estleman – author
 Michael Harris - scholar and leader
 Anthony Iannaccone – conductor, composer and professor of music
 John W Mills – British sculptor (visiting professor 1970–1971)
 Elmer Mitchell – "father of intramural sports"
 Tracie Morris – poet and literature professor
 Heather Neff – poet, author and literature professor
 Barry Pyle – political scientist and professor
 Edward Sidlow – scholar of United States Congress
 Fatos Tarifa – Albanian diplomat
 John Texter – engineer
 Thomas Tyra – director of bands, composer and professor of music
 Ron Westrum – sociologist

Administration

Presidents

A total of 23 people have served as the president, 22 men and 1 woman.  This includes previous presidents under the school's past names Eastern Michigan College, Michigan State Normal College, and Michigan State Normal School.

References

Eastern Michigan University